Olivier Ledroit is a French comic book artist, perhaps best known for his work on the Black Moon Chronicles series. He has also worked on art designs in the Might and Magic franchise.

He has also provided the art for Requiem Chevalier Vampire and Sha, both written by Pat Mills.

Bibliography

Black Moon Chronicles (with Froideval):
 "Le signe des Ténèbres"
 "Le Vent des Dragons"
 "La marque des démons"
 "Quand sifflent les Serpents"
 "La danse écarlate"
Black Moon's Arcanas (with Froideval):
 "Ghorghor Bey"
Sha (with Pat Mills):
 "The Shadow One" (1995)
 "Soul Wound" (1996)
 "Soul Vengeance" (1997)
Xoco (with Mosdi)
 "Papillon Obsidienne"
 "Notre Seigneur l'Ecorche"
Requiem Chevalier Vampire (with Pat Mills)
 "Resurrection" (November 2000)
 "Danse Macabre" (September 2001)
 "Dracula" (May 2002)
 "Le Bal des Vampires" (November 2003)
 "Dragon Blitz" (November 2004)
 "Hellfire Club" (November 2005)
 "Le Couvent des soeurs de sang" (February 2007)

Awards
2007: Won the "Favourite European Comics" Eagle Award, for Requiem Chevalier Vampire with Pat Mills

References

 Olivier Ledroit at Lambiek
 Olivier Ledroit at Bedetheque 
 

Living people
1969 births
French comics artists